Richard Lynn Carpenter (born October 15, 1946) is an American musician, singer, songwriter, and record producer, who formed half of the sibling duo the Carpenters alongside his younger sister Karen. He had numerous roles in the Carpenters, including record producer, arranger, pianist, keyboardist, and songwriter, as well as joining with Karen on harmony vocals.

Childhood
Richard Lynn Carpenter was born at Grace-New Haven Hospital (now called Yale New Haven Hospital) in New Haven, Connecticut, the same hospital where his sister, Karen, was later born. His parents were Agnes Reuwer Tatum (a housewife) (March 5, 1915 – November 10, 1996) and Harold Bertram Carpenter (November 8, 1908 – October 15, 1988). Harold was born in China, where his own parents were missionaries, and was educated at boarding schools in England, before working in the printing business. Carpenter was named after his father's younger brother, Richard Lynn Carpenter. Carpenter and his uncle both married women named Mary. Richard and his sister were baptized into the United Methodist Church and as children were part of the Methodist Youth Ministry.

Carpenter frequently played the piano while his younger sister, Karen, played baseball outside. He and Karen also liked to listen to the children's records their father bought for them when they were young. Richard was introduced to Perry Como and Ella Fitzgerald, among many others through his father's record collection,  and by age 12, he knew he wanted to be in the music business. His first public appearance as a musician was at age 16 in New Haven. Along with two older friends, a group was formed and they played at a local pizza parlor.  Richard joined the venture to earn money to buy a car.  The Carpenter family moved from New Haven to Downey, California, in June 1963. They wanted Richard to further his music career, and the family was tired of the cold New England winters.

After graduating from Downey High School in 1964, Carpenter studied music at California State College at Long Beach (now known as California State University, Long Beach). There, he met Frank Pooler, a conductor and composer who wrote the lyrics to the Christmas classic "Merry Christmas Darling" in 1968. Richard also met his good friend John Bettis, who co-wrote songs with Richard. At Long Beach, Richard also met Gary Sims, Dan Woodhams, and Doug Strawn, who later became members of the Carpenters’ live band.

The Richard Carpenter Trio, Spectrum and Summerchimes
Carpenter created the Richard Carpenter Trio in 1965 with sister Karen and friend Wes Jacobs. Richard played the piano, Karen played the drums, and Wes played the tuba and bass.

In 1966, the Richard Carpenter Trio played "Iced Tea" and "The Girl from Ipanema" at the Hollywood Bowl Battle of the Bands. They won the competition, and shortly afterward recorded three songs at RCA Studios: "Every Little Thing", "Strangers in the Night", and the Carpenter original, "Iced Tea". "Iced Tea" is the only recording that was officially released to the public.

Around 1967, Richard and Karen joined four other student musicians from Long Beach State to form a sextet, Spectrum, consisting of:
Richard Carpenter
Karen Carpenter
John Bettis
Leslie Johnston
Gary Sims
Danny Woodhams

Although Spectrum played frequently at LA-area nightclubs such as Whisky a Go Go, they met with an unenthusiastic response—their broad harmonies and avoidance of rock 'n' roll limited the band's commercial potential. Yet Spectrum was fruitful in another way, providing the raw material of future success: Bettis went on to become a lyricist for Richard's songs, and all the other members, except Leslie Johnston, went on to become members of the Carpenters..  Following Spectrum, Carpenter formed Summerchimes.  In a similar vein to Spectrum, the group was also short lived but produced "Don't be Afraid", "All of My Life" and several other songs which appeared on the Carpenters' debut album.

Career
Richard and Karen signed with A&M Records on April 22, 1969. "Let's hope we have some hits," Herb Alpert told the two. According to Richard, Alpert gave them artistic freedom in the recording studios, but after Offering, their first album, was released and wasn't a big seller, it was rumored that some of A&M's people were asking Alpert to release the Carpenters, but he believed in their talent and insisted on giving them another chance.

Alpert suggested that the Carpenters record a Burt Bacharach and Hal David song called "(They Long to Be) Close to You" written in 1963. Though Richard worked up an arrangement only at Alpert's insistence, the song was an overnight hit. Released on May 14, 1970, it rocketed up the Top 40 charts to No. 1, where it stayed for four weeks during June and July, paving the way for the duo's future releases.

Sitting at home one night, Richard was watching TV and saw a commercial for Crocker National Bank. He recognized the voices of Paul Williams and Roger Nichols, two A&M songwriters on the commercial's theme song "We've Only Just Begun". Richard made some calls to confirm their involvement, and asked if there was a full version of the song, which Williams affirmed. Carpenter managed to turn the bank commercial jingle into an RIAA-certified Gold record. It peaked at No. 2 on the Billboard Hot 100, and has become a popular wedding song. The song also successfully launched the careers of Nichols and Williams, who went on to write multiple hits for the Carpenters and many other artists.

Richard composed many of the Carpenters' hits as well, with John Bettis as lyricist, such as:
"Goodbye to Love" (1972; #7; one of the first pop ballads to have a fuzz guitar solo—influenced the development of the power ballad)
"Top of the World" (1972; #1. Though the Carpenters originally opted to not release this song as a single, a version recorded by Lynn Anderson reached No. 2 on the Billboard Country chart; following the success of Anderson's version, the Carpenters decided to release their version as a single, and it reached number one on the Billboard Hot 100.)
"Yesterday Once More" (1973; #2)
"Only Yesterday" (1975; #4)

Quaalude addiction and treatment
In the late 1970s, while Karen was suffering from the anorexia nervosa that ultimately led to her death in 1983, Richard suffered from insomnia, panic attacks, depression, and an addiction to Quaalude, a sedative and hypnotic medication. Author James Gavin noted in his New York Times review of Randy L. Schmidt's biography Little Girl Blue: The Life of Karen Carpenter (2010): "His mother is said to have given him his first pill," an observation that was previously portrayed in the CBS-TV  television film The Karen Carpenter Story (1989) and commented on in several of that made-for-TV movie's reviews, which also noted that Agnes (their mother) had been taking them under prescription and thus thought they were safe. At the time he sought help, Carpenter had a doctor's prescription for Quaalude as a sleep aid, but his use had gotten out of hand.

A reviewer of the BBC biopic Only Yesterday: The Carpenters Story (2007) notes: "As their fame grew, cracks began to show in their wholesome facade. An insane touring schedule began to take its toll and Richard took refuge in heroic doses of quaaludes. Meanwhile, Karen started worrying about her weight. The worrying became obsession. The cracks became faultlines. The centre could not hold."

Dr. Gabe Mirkin wrote in "The Sad Story of Karen Carpenter" (2014): "In those years, you could tell that something was wrong because the Carpenters frequently cancelled appearances. She appeared unhealthily thin, weighing only 90 pounds when she was 25. Richard appeared to be forgetful, and it was later found that he was addicted to Quaaludes. In 1978, the Carpenters stopped touring and in 1979 Richard went into treatment to cure his dependency on this drug."

Nick Talevski similarly observes in Rock Obituaries – Knocking on Heaven's Door (2010): "Constantly on the road since 1970 with their Vegas-style act, both Karen and Richard Carpenter were in ill health by late 1975. With Karen's weight down to 80 pounds, a tour had to be cancelled. Richard, meanwhile, had become addicted to a prescription drug, Quaalude."

By late 1978, Richard was receiving "much encouragement (and browbeating) from family and friends, to ‘face the music.’" Finally, in January 1979, semicomatose on Quaaludes, Richard fell down a flight of stairs backstage and finally confronted his addiction." He checked into a six-week treatment program at the Menninger Clinic in Topeka, Kansas, and kicked his habit. "For any number of reasons, the first three weeks were 'hell on earth,' Richard says, 'but after that, things really started to change, and of course, all for the better.' Still, all of this had been a monumental change for Richard and he decided it was wise not to dive right back into work, and to pretty much take the rest of 1979 off, all the better to get accustomed to his changed fortunes."

Post-Carpenters activities

On October 12, 1983, eight months after Karen's death, the Carpenter family celebrated the unveiling of the Carpenters' new star on the Hollywood Walk of Fame. Carpenter said in his speech, "This is a sad day, but at the same time a very special and beautiful day to my family and [me]. My only regret is that Karen is not physically here to share it with us, but I know that she is very much alive in our minds, and in our hearts."

On June 26, 1986, Carpenter started recording the solo album Time and finished it on July 5, 1987. The album features Dusty Springfield singing "Something in Your Eyes", Dionne Warwick singing "In Love Alone", Scott Grimes singing "That's What I Believe" and a song Richard created – dedicated to Karen – called "When Time Was All We Had", which starts off a cappella, but then Richard's piano fades in as well as Herb Alpert's flugelhorn. Lyrics include:

Our hearts were filled with music and laughter,
Your voice will be the sweetest sound I'll ever hear and yet,
We knew somehow the song would never end,
When time was all we had to spend.

In 1989, Carpenter arranged, produced and performed on Scott Grimes's eponymous debut album.

In 1996, at the suggestion of music writer Daniel Levitin, Carpenter recorded and released Richard Carpenter: Pianist, Arranger, Composer, Conductor, which included reworkings of many Carpenters favorites, including hits and album tracks, and ends with "Karen's Theme", which Carpenter composed for the television film The Karen Carpenter Story (1989).

Carpenter released the DVDs Gold: Greatest Hits (2002), a repackaging of the VHS/Betamax Yesterday Once More (released in 1985, two years after Karen's death in 1983) that contains all the videos from Yesterday Once More, and Interpretations (2003), which updates the original, VHS/cassette tape released in 1995 and includes footage from the Carpenters' five TV specials and TV series from 1971 to 1980. The DVD follows the compilation album of the same name, which had been released earlier the same year, and includes eleven Carpenters' tracks never before available on DVD (including "From This Moment On", an outtake from the Carpenters' fifth television special), all of them digitally enhanced and remastered in stereo audio.

On his 62nd birthday in October 2008, at a luncheon for The Foreign Correspondents Club of Japan, Carpenter announced plans for "his career comeback – dubbed 'Richard Carpenter Strikes Back'"—which included "the re-release of a Carpenters Christmas album and a tribute album featuring other versions of Carpenters songs."

Documentaries
The 43-minute film Superstar: The Karen Carpenter Story (1987) was directed by Todd Haynes and was withdrawn from circulation in 1990, after Haynes lost a copyright infringement lawsuit filed by Richard. The film's title is derived from the Carpenters' 1971 hit song, "Superstar". Over the years, it has developed into a cult film and is included in Entertainment Weeklys 2003 list of top 50 cult movies.

Carpenter helped in the productions of the documentaries Close to You: Remembering the Carpenters (1997) and Only Yesterday: The Carpenters Story (2007).

Scholarship/talent show
Carpenter funds an annual scholarship/talent show for people with artistic abilities that is held at the Thousand Oaks Civic Center.

Gear
Carpenter used a wide range of keyboard instruments including grand piano, Hammond organ, Wurlitzer electric piano, ARP Odyssey, Fender Rhodes electric piano, harpsichord, celesta, synthesizer and tack piano. His favorite grand piano was Baldwin. In the '70s, he initially endorsed and used Wurlitzer electric pianos before switching to the Fender Rhodes electric piano. He says that at A&M Studios, he regularly used a Steinway piano on the Carpenters' records with the exception of the A Song for You album in which he played a Baldwin piano which was autographed by Liberace.

On stage, he had both a Wurlitzer electric piano and grand piano, but after switching to the Fender Rhodes, he would simply choose among the three for various songs on stage. He has described the sound of the Wurlitzer electric piano as "warm" and "beautiful" and via overdubbing in the studio, he regularly supplemented his grand piano with a Wurlitzer electric piano to thicken the sound, thus creating a distinctive keyboard sound.

On the song "Happy" on Horizon, he made his earliest experiments with the ARP Odyssey synthesizer.

Personal life
In 1984, Carpenter married his non–blood related cousin, Mary Rudolph. Her brother, Mark Rudolph, was the Carpenters' road manager as well as the radio call-in "contestant" in the [Oldies] "Medley" on the album Now & Then (1973). The couple had been dating since the late 1970s. A young Mary made a cameo appearance in the Carpenters' promotional video for the song "I Need to Be in Love" (1976).

Richard and Mary Carpenter have five children: Kristi Lynn (the name Karen would have given to a daughter) was born on August 17, 1987; Traci Tatum on July 25, 1989; Mindi Karen (named after her late paternal aunt) on July 7, 1992; Collin Paul on July 20, 1994; and Taylor Mary on December 5, 2000. The family resides in Thousand Oaks, California, and Richard and the children sometimes perform music together at various Carpenter-related events.

Carpenter is a Mopar automobile enthusiast, and original owner of a 1970 Plymouth Barracuda with the unusual 440 6-BBL V8 engine and automatic transmission package.

 Biographies 
In 2021, longtime Carpenters historian Chris May and Associated Press entertainment journalist Mike Cidoni Lennox published Carpenters: The Musical Legacy, based on interviews with Richard Carpenter. It features rare photographs and newly revealed stories behind the making of the albums. Goldmine said the book "provided a candid and detailed look at much of what went into the Carpenters sound as well as Richard's personal thoughts on the music business today."

Discography
 The Carpenters 

Solo albums

Solo singles

ReferencesCitationsSources'

External links
Richard and Karen Carpenter Official website
 
Make Your Own Kind of Music – 1971 Summer Television Series

1946 births
Living people
Musicians from New Haven, Connecticut
American male pop singers
American pop pianists
American pop rock singers
American Methodists
American soft rock musicians
Musicians from Downey, California
Ballad musicians
The Carpenters members
California State University, Long Beach alumni
American jazz pianists
American male pianists
American male songwriters
American music arrangers
American male conductors (music)
Record producers from California
American pop keyboardists
20th-century American pianists
20th-century American conductors (music)
21st-century American conductors (music)
American male jazz musicians
20th-century American keyboardists
Jazz musicians from California
A&M Records artists
Decca Records artists